The year 1696 in music involved some significant events.

Events
Giacomo Antonio Perti becomes maestro di cappella to S Petronio, Bologna, where he remains for the rest of his life.
Francesco Antonio Pistocchi becomes maestro di cappella to the Duke of Ansbach.

Published popular music

Classical music
Henrico Albicastro – Il giardino armonico sacro-profano
Heinrich Ignaz Franz von Biber – Harmonia artificioso-ariosa
John Blow – Ode on the Death of Purcell
Dieterich Buxtehude – VII suonate, op. 2
Marc-Antoine Charpentier – Ego mater agnitionis, H.371
Johann Caspar Ferdinand Fischer – Les pièces de clavessin, Op.2
Johann Kuhnau – Frische Klavierfrüchte
Isabella Leonarda – Messe e motetti concertate, Op.18
Nicola Matteis – A Collection of New Songs
Franz Xaver Murschhauser – Octi-tonium novum organicum, octo tonis ecclesiasticis, ad Psalmos, & magnificat
Henry Purcell – A Choice Collection of Lessons for the Harpsichord or Spinnet (published posthumously)
Johann Paul von Westhoff – Six Partitas for solo violin

Opera
Tomaso Albinoni – Zenone, Imperator d'Oriente
Giuseppe Aldrovandini – Dafni
Giovanni Bononcini – Il Trionfo di Camilla
Sebastián Durón – Salir el amor del mundo 
John Eccles – The Loves of Mars and Venus
Marin Marais – Ariane et Bacchus
Bernardo Pasquini – Radamisto
Daniel Purcell – Brutus of Alba
Alessandro Scarlatti – La Didone delirante, R.344.30

Births
February 10 – Johann Melchior Molter, violinist and composer (died 1765)
February 17 – Ernst Gottlieb Baron, lutenist and composer (died 1760)
May 23 – Johann Caspar Vogler, organist and composer (died 1763)
August 12 – Maurice Greene, composer (died 1725)
November 11 – Andrea Zani, violinist and composer (died 1757)
December 25 – Prince Johann Ernst of Saxe-Weimar, amateur composer (died 1715)
date unknown
Pierre Février, organist, harpsichordist and composer (died 1760)
Marged ferch Ifan, harpist and wrestler (died 1793)

Deaths
April 21 – Jacques Gallot, composer
May 31 – Heinrich Schwemmer, composer and music teacher (born 1621)
June 29 – Michel Lambert, French composer of airs (born 1610)
July 25 – Clamor Heinrich Abel, German composer (born 1634)

References

 
17th century in music
Music by year